The United States House of Representatives, commonly known as the lower chamber of the United States Congress, along with the United States Senate, commonly known as the upper chamber, are the two parts of the legislative branch of the federal government of the United States. Like its counterpart, the House was established by the United States Constitution and convened for its first meeting on March 4, 1789, at Federal Hall in New York City. The history of this institution begins several years prior to that date, at the dawn of the American Revolutionary War.

The Continental Congresses

The First Continental Congress was a meeting of representatives of twelve of Great Britain's seventeen North American colonies, in the autumn of 1774. The Continental Congress sent a list of grievances to King George III. When the King failed to respond, and the American Revolutionary War began in April 1775, the Second Continental Congress was convened—this time with thirteen colonies in attendance. A year later, on July 4, 1776, the Continental Congress declared the thirteen colonies free and independent states, referring to them as the "united States of America." This was not a formal name, however, so "united" was not capitalized in the Declaration of Independence, "States" being capitalized only because all nouns were capitalized in English before the Industrial Revolution. The Second Continental Congress continued in office while the War for Independence continued, producing the Articles of Confederation— the country's first constitution— in 1777, which was ratified by all of the states by 1781.

Articles of Confederation and new Constitution
Under the Articles of Confederation, the Congress of the Confederation was a unicameral body in which each state was equally represented, and in which each state had a veto over most action. States could, and did, ignore what did pass. The ineffectiveness of the federal government under the Articles led Congress to summon the Convention of 1787.

One of the most divisive issues facing the Convention was the structure of Congress. James Madison's Virginia Plan called for a bicameral Congress; the lower house would be elected directly by the people, and the upper house would be elected by the lower house. The plan drew the support of delegates from large states such as Virginia, Massachusetts, and Pennsylvania, as it called for representation based on population. The smaller states, however, favored the New Jersey Plan, which called for a unicameral Congress with equal representation for the states. Eventually, a compromise, known as the Connecticut Compromise or the Great Compromise was reached; one house of Congress (the House of Representatives) would provide proportional representation, whereas the other (the Senate) would provide equal representation.  The Constitution was ratified by the end of 1788, and its full implementation was set for March 4, 1789.

18th century

The House of Representatives began work on April 1, 1789, when it achieved a quorum for the first time, with 59 members elected from 11 states. In 1790, North Carolina and Rhode Island elected representatives (see: 1788 and 1789 United States House of Representatives elections), bringing the total count of representatives to 65.

In the 1st United States Congress, Frederick Muhlenberg, a Pennsylvania Lutheran minister and politician, was the first Speaker of the House.

19th century
The early 19th century was marked by the assertion of Congress' gradual independence from the Presidency starting from the presidency of James Madison and onward. The House became the preeminent institution in Congress, originally overshadowing the Senate. For most of the first half of the 19th century, a balance between the free North and the slaveholding South existed in the Senate, as the numbers of free and slave states were equal. However, since the North was much more populous than the South, it dominated the House of Representatives. In 1825, new Speaker of the House Henry Clay also officially announced that he and his followers would separate from Andrew Jackson and form the National Republican Party. Clay lost to Jackson in the 1832 presidential election and moved to the Senate.

During the Civil War, the key policy-maker in Congress was Thaddeus Stevens, as chairman of the Ways and Means Committee and as Republican floor leader. He took charge of major legislation that funded the war effort and revolutionized the nation's economic policies regarding tariffs, bonds, income and excise taxes, national banks, suppression of money issued by state banks, greenback currency, and western railroad land grants.

Stevens was also one of the major policymakers regarding Reconstruction, and obtained a House vote of impeachment against President Andrew Johnson (who was acquitted by the Senate in 1868). Hans Trefousse, his leading biographer, concludes that Stevens "was one of the most influential representatives ever to serve in Congress. [He dominated] the House with his wit, knowledge of parliamentary law, and sheer willpower, even though he was often unable to prevail." Historiographical views of Stevens have dramatically shifted over the years, from the early 20th-century view of Stevens and the Radical Republicans as tools of big business and motivated by hatred of the white South, to the perspective of the neoabolitionists of the 1950s and afterwards, who applauded their efforts to give equal rights to the freed slaves.

The Democrats were a weak minority from 1861 to 1874, then made a major comeback in 1874 by winning 93 seats held by the GOP and becoming the majority. The Gilded Age was marked by close balances in the House, with the parties alternating control.

Between 1860 and 1920 the average tenure of House members doubled from four to eight years. This number reflects the growth of "congressional careerism." The House began to develop a more stable culture, sessions of the House became longer, and members of the House began to specialize in specific areas of policy. Power was decentralized from the Speaker of the House, and seniority nearly assured advancement within the House. The increasing importance of the federal government, an increasing acceptance of lengthy congressional service, and (after 1896) a decline in the partisan competitiveness of congressional districts all contributed to the growing length of the average term of House members.

20th and 21st-centuries

The early 20th century witnessed the rise of party leadership in both houses of Congress. In the House of Representatives, the office of Speaker became extremely powerful, reaching its zenith under the Republican Joseph Gurney Cannon. In particular, committee chairmen remained particularly strong in both houses until the rules reforms of the 1970s.

On November 7, 1916, Jeannette Rankin was elected to Montana's at-large seat in the House of Representatives, becoming the first female member of Congress. In 1973 Speaker of the House Carl Albert appointed Felda Looper as the first female page in the House of Representatives.

After the beginning of the Great Depression and the New Deal, the Democrats controlled the House from 1931 to 1994, with two exceptions (1946 and 1952), as the New Deal Coalition was successful. In terms of legislation, however, the Conservative coalition usually blocked liberal legislative proposals, except in 1964–65 when President Lyndon Johnson had the majorities to pass his Great Society proposals. The most important leader was long-time Democratic Speaker Sam Rayburn. The Republicans under Newt Gingrich returned to a majority in the election of 1994, as part of the Republican Revolution that gave the party both houses and a majority of governorships that year.

The Democrats gained 30 seats in the 2006 elections, regaining control and electing Nancy Pelosi as the first female Speaker. They strengthened their control during the 2008 elections, gaining an additional 21 seats. However, the Republicans soon erased those gains after gaining 63 seats in the 2010 elections, the largest seat change for any election since 1948. Republican control of the house remained until the 2018 elections.

Number of Representatives

Congress has the power to regulate the size of the House of Representatives, and the size of the House has varied through the years in response to the admission of new states, reapportionment following a census, and the Civil War.

In 1911, Congress passed the Apportionment Act of 1911, also known as 'Public Law 62-5', which capped the size of the United States House of Representatives at 435 seats. Arizona, New Mexico, Alaska, and Hawaii were each granted one representative when they first entered the union.  During the next reapportionment, the size of the House was again limited to 435 seats, with the seats divided among the states by population, with each state getting at least one seat.

By the 2000s, the U.S. population had more than tripled since the 1911 expansion of the House to its current 435 seats; accordingly, proposals began to be made by commentators such as George F. Will, Robert Novak, and Paul Jacob to further increase the size of the House. One such proposal, the Wyoming Rule, calls for adding enough members to Congress to reduce the population of the average Congressional district to the population of the least populous state's smallest district; in 1990, this would have resulted in a total House size of 547.

References

Further reading
American National Biography (1999), contains biographies of all politicians no longer alive.
 Alexander, De Alva Stanwood. History and Procedure of the House of Representatives (1916) Alva Stanwood Alexander&dcontributors=De%20Alva%20Stanwood%20Alexander online edition
 Barone, Michael, and Grant Ujifusa, The Almanac of American Politics 1976: The Senators, the Representatives and the Governors: Their Records and Election Results, Their States and Districts (1975).
 Davidson, Roger H., and Walter J. Oleszek, eds. (1998). Congress and Its Members, 6th ed. Washington DC: Congressional Quarterly. (Legislative procedure, informal practices, and member information)
 Roger H. Davidson, Susan Webb Hammond, Raymond W. Smock, eds; Masters of the House: Congressional Leadership over Two Centuries Westview Press, 1998 online edition
 Galloway; George B. History of the House of Representatives (1962) online edition
 Green, Matthew N. The Speaker of the House: A Study of Leadership (Yale University Press; 2010) 292 pages; Examines partisan pressures and other factors that shaped the leadership of the speaker of the U.S. House of Representatives; focuses on the period since 1940.
 Hunt, Richard. (1998). "Using the Records of Congress in the Classroom," OAH Magazine of History, 12 (Summer): 34–37.
 MacNeil, Neil. Forge of Democracy: The House of Representatives (1963) popular history by a journalist
 Remini, Robert V.  The House: The History of the House of Representatives (2006) standard scholarly history
 Ritchie, Donald A. (1997). "What Makes a Successful Congressional Investigation." OAH Magazine of History, 11 (Spring): 6–8.
 Wilson, Woodrow. (1885). Congressional Government.
 Zelizer, Julian E. On Capitol Hill: The Struggle to Reform Congress and its Consequences, 1948–2000 (2004)
 Zelizer, Julian E. ed. The American Congress: The Building of Democracy (2004), essays by leading scholars
 Zelizer, Julian E. "Burning Down the House: Newt Gingrich, the Fall of a Speaker, and the Rise of the New Republican Party'' (Penguin, 2020), focus on Jim Wright and Newt Gingrich in 1990s.

See also
History of the United States Senate
Party divisions of United States Congresses

.
House of Representatives
United States House of Representatives
History of the United States by topic